Rade Lisica (born April 8, 1997) is a Slovenian professional basketball player.

Professional career 
Lisica played for Slovenian teams Zlatorog Laško, Sixt Primorska and LHT Castings Škofja. In February 2019, he joined Serbian team Vojvodina of the Basketball League of Serbia.

Personal life 
His father is a former Serbian professional basketball player Mileta Lisica. Also, his younger brother Đorđe (born 1999) is a basketball player.

References

External links 
 Profile at eurobasket.com
 Profile at realgm.com
 Profile at ABA League

1997 births
Living people
Basketball League of Serbia players
Centers (basketball)
KK Vojvodina players
KK Zlatorog Laško players
Slovenian expatriate basketball people in Serbia
Slovenian men's basketball players
Slovenian people of Serbian descent
Sportspeople from Celje